"Loved Too Much" is a song written by Billy Livsey and Don Schlitz, and recorded by American country music artist Ty Herndon.  It was released in March 1997 as the third single from his album Living in a Moment.  The song reached number 2 on the Billboard Hot Country Singles & Tracks chart in June 1997.

Chart performance
"Loved Too Much" debuted at number 73 on the U.S. Billboard Hot Country Singles & Tracks for the week of March 22, 1997 and peaked as high as number two for two consecutive weeks, but was kept out of the top spot by "It's Your Love" by Tim McGraw and Faith Hill.

Year-end charts

References

1997 singles
1996 songs
Ty Herndon songs
Songs written by Don Schlitz
Songs written by Billy Livsey
Epic Records singles
Song recordings produced by Doug Johnson (record producer)